Plasticicumulans acidivorans is a bacterium from the genus of Plasticicumulans.

References

Alteromonadales
Bacteria described in 2011